This is the discography of Rakim, an American rapper.

Studio albums

Compilations

Singles

Featured appearances

References 

Hip hop discographies
Discographies of American artists